The Lewistown Central Business Historic District is a  historic district in Lewistown, Montana, which was listed on the National Register of Historic Places in 1985.  The listing included 54 contributing buildings.

It includes the already-listed St. Leo's Catholic Church and the Masonic Temple.

The district is roughly bounded by Washington St., 1st Ave., Janeaux St., and 8th Ave., in Lewistown.

References

		
Historic districts on the National Register of Historic Places in Montana
National Register of Historic Places in Fergus County, Montana
Victorian architecture in Montana